Carol Roberts may refer to:

 Carol Roberts (politician) (born 1936), Florida politician
 Carol Roberts (footballer) (born 1964), New Zealand footballer
 Carol R. Roberts (born 1942), New Hampshire politician

See also

 Carol Robert of Anjou (1288–1342)